This is a list of all the United States Supreme Court cases from volume 389 of the United States Reports:

External links

1967 in United States case law
1968 in United States case law